Strange Son: Two Mothers, Two Sons, and the Quest to Unlock the Hidden World of Autism is a non-fiction book that follows the story of Portia Iversen's second son who initially appeared to be developing normally, but started to have autistic characteristics by the age of two. His mother heard about an autistic 14-year-old boy in India who had been taught to communicate so well that he could write poetry. She decided to bring the boy and his mother to California to see if their success could be replicated with her own son.

Plot summary
Portia Iversen's second son Dov, born in 1992, seemed normal as a baby. By the age of two, he reacted atypically to noises and also made odd noises  himself. By the time he was three years old, he was unable to speak and was fascinated by objects. This led to a diagnosis of autism. At the age of eight, Dov was still uncommunicative.

Portia heard about an autistic boy named Tito that lived in Bangalore, India with his mother, Soma Mukhopadhyay. Soma had taught her son how to communicate, write poetry, and explain how the poetry made him feel.

This story inspired Portia to want to help her own son in the same manner. She invited Soma and Tito to California for a month in the hope that Soma could help her son become communicative. Soma's methods were unusual but she managed to help Dov start communicating with his parents.

Charity
Portia's husband Jon Shestack started an organization called Cure Autism Now (CAN). CAN's goal was not only to find a cure, but to also increase people's understanding of those with autism. A part of all sales Iversen's book benefited CAN's Innovative Technology for Autism initiative.
CAN merged with the Autism Speaks organization in 2007; the merged group uses the name "Autism Speaks."

Autism and vaccines

Ernst VanBergeijk of Journal of Autism and Developmental Disorders found it disappointing that there was a mention in passing that Dov started showing signs of autism after a vaccination. Ernst said, "This causal impression does a disservice to families" because there are "mountains of data finding no causal link between vaccines and autism".

Reception
Abigail Zuger, M.D. of The New York Times said that the book does not gloss over problems as is common in other books that detail medical stories. Regis Schilken of Blogcritics said that "Strange Son should be read by psychiatrists, psychologists, doctors, counselors, and at all costs, by politicians who must provide money for autism research."

References

Books about autism